Bukidnon's 4th congressional district is one of the four congressional districts of the Philippines in the province of Bukidnon. It has been represented in the House of Representatives of the Philippines since 2013. The district consists of the province's most populous city, Valencia, and the municipalities of Kalilangan and Pangantucan. It is currently represented in the 19th Congress by Laarni Roque of the Nacionalista Party (NP), who has represented the district since its creation.

Representation history

Election results

2016

See also 

 Legislative districts of Bukidnon

References 

Congressional districts of the Philippines
Politics of Bukidnon
2012 establishments in the Philippines
Congressional districts of Northern Mindanao
Constituencies established in 2012